Qingyang Xifeng Airport  is an airport serving the city of Qingyang in Gansu Province, China.

Qingyang Airport was built in 1976 and opened to traffic in 1977, with a runway length of 1,800 m. The airport was closed in 1993 due to the ageing of the runway and the lack of suitable aircraft types. In 2003, Qingyang Airport was renovated as a 3C regional airport and was officially reopened on December 26, 2005. After the resumption of flights, Qingyang Airport was closed again in September 2010 due to the low flight area, limited routes and the elimination of suitable aircraft types. On 21 November 2012, the airport resumed flights after an expansion to meet the 4C condition The expanded runway is 2,600 metres long and 48 metres wide. It is expected to handle 160,000 passengers, 550 tonnes of cargo and mail, and 3,200 aircraft movements in 2020.

Airlines and destinations

See also
List of airports in China
List of the busiest airports in China

References

Airports in Gansu
Qingyang